"Da Da Da I Don't Love You You Don't Love Me Aha Aha Aha" (usually shortened to "Da Da Da") is a song by the German band Trio. Trio was formed in 1980 by Stephan Remmler, Gert "Kralle" Krawinkel and Peter Behrens. Released as a single in 1982 and featured on their 1981 self-titled debut album, "Da Da Da" became a hit in Germany and about 30 other countries, selling 13 million copies worldwide. The lyrics were written by Remmler, the music by Krawinkel. "Da Da Da" remains the band's biggest German hit and their only hit outside Germany.

Background and composition 
It is known in many language versions:
German version as "" (or simply "Da Da Da")
English version as "Da Da Da I don't love you you don't love me"
French version as "Da Da Da je t'aime pas tu m'aimes pas"

The song "Da Da Da" became quite popular despite being extremely repetitive. It was a product of the Neue Deutsche Welle (or NDW). However, Trio preferred the name Neue Deutsche Fröhlichkeit, which means "New German Cheerfulness", to describe their music. At that time, popular songs were based on extremely simple structures that were ornately produced. Trio's main principle was to remove almost all the ornamentation and polish from their songs, and to use the simplest practical structures (most of their songs were three-chord songs). For this reason, many of their songs are restricted to drums, guitar, vocals, and just one or maybe two other instruments, if any at all. Bass was used very infrequently until their later songs, and live shows often saw Remmler playing some simple pre-programmed rhythms and melodies on his small Casio VL-1 keyboard while Behrens played his drums with one hand and ate an apple with the other. Remmler used a contact microphone on his throat to achieve a different timbre to his voice on lyrics where he stepped away from the regular mic.

Chart positions 
 The song was a chart success in more than 30 countries.
 The German version of "Da Da Da" reached No. 2 on the charts (April 1982). There were three versions: the single version for 3:23, a longer version for 6:36. The live version came in the album Trio live im Frühjahr 82 and goes on for 1:32. On the B-side of the 7" single release was "Sabine Sabine Sabine", whereas the B-Side of the maxi-single carried two more songs: "Halt mich fest ich werd verrückt" and "Lady-O-Lady".
 In the UK, "Da Da Da" hit No. 2 in July 1982. The single version goes on for 3:23 and the longer version for 6:36.
 In Canada, it peaked at No. 3 in December 1982.
 In France, the song was made more popular in 1982 with Zam making a French version titled "Da Da Da je t'aime pas tu m'aimes pas".
 In the US, the song peaked at No. 33 on the dance charts. In 1997, the song gained further chart success when the CD of TRIO and Error was released as Da Da Da I Don't Love You You Don't Love Me Aha Aha Aha in the United States and was a US-only promo CD-single in response to the 1997 US Volkswagen Golf commercial that featured the song "Da Da Da I Don't Love You You Don't Love Me Aha Aha Aha", often contracted to simply "Da Da Da". The re-release had some changes: two songs were added to the CD and the album was digitally remastered. The shorter version known as a radio edit version goes on for 2:49.

Weekly charts

Year-end charts

Sales and certifications

Cover versions 
In 1982, German singer and actor Frank Zander released a cover of the song titled "Da da da ich weiß Bescheid, du weißt Bescheid" that also reached number two on the West German chart. The same year, an Italian version made by I Masters (a trio formed by three Italian young men, Paolo Paltrinieri, Lorenzo Canovi and Romeo Corpetti) called Da Da Da Mundial '82 was made after Italy's victory at the 1982 FIFA World Cup, with the lyrics honouring the Italian team, with the part prior to the refrain, before the "Aha" saying Son tutti figli di Bearzot (translated, They are all sons of Bearzot). In early 2019, YouTuber MaximillianMus created a parody titled, "Oh Yeah Yeah", and ordered his fanbase to take over YouTube comment sections, title-dropping the song across many videos on the platform, prompting YouTuber/rapper KSI to address the meme in one of his videos.

See also 
Dada
Lists of number-one singles (Austria)
List of number-one singles from the 1980s (New Zealand)
List of number-one singles of the 1980s (Switzerland)

Note

References

External links 
Lyrics of "Da Da Da"

1981 songs
1982 singles
Number-one singles in Austria
Number-one singles in New Zealand
Number-one singles in South Africa
Number-one singles in Switzerland
Trio (band) songs
German synth-pop songs
German-language songs